Qué pena tu vida is a 2010 Chilean comedy film written and directed by Nicolás López.

Cast 
 Ariel Levy as Javier Fernández
 Lucy Cominetti as Sofía Coccolo
 Andrea Velasco as Ángela de María
  as Walter Gómez
 Carolina de Moras as María del Pilar Lyon.
 Paz Bascuñán as Mariana Vargas.

References

External links 

Chilean comedy films
2010s Chilean films
2010s Spanish-language films
2010s comedy films